Bearsville Sound Studio was a recording studio founded by Albert Grossman in Bearsville, New York, 
 west of Woodstock in 1969.

History
Albert Grossman, who was the manager of Bob Dylan and Peter, Paul and Mary, first arrived in Bearsville in 1964 with his future wife, Sally, and Dylan via Dylan's station wagon, and went to work creating a retreat for the community of artists with whom he worked. The Bearsville studio facilities would eventually be just one component of the complex that would eventually include Bearsville Records, Turtle Creek Barn and Apartments, Location Recorders, the Bearsville Theatre, and multiple restaurants. The two-hour drive from New York City, a "retreat" for some artists, combined with residences owned by Albert Grossman, amplified this value.

Bearsville's first studio, Studio B, was completed in 1969. Studio B was initially designed by Robert Hansen and later re-designed and modified by John Storyk of the Walters-Storyk Design Group and acoustician George Augspurger. The larger Studio A featured a large 2,400 square foot tracking room with a 35-foot high ceiling. 

Originally intended as a project studio for Robbie Robertson and Garth Hudson of The Band, Turtle Creek Barn and Apartments offered recording facilities combined with a private living space.

Todd Rundgren began working at Bearsville Studios as a producer and engineer, and in 1980, Grossman built Rundgren's Utopia Video Studio, which would later house radio station WDST.

In 1985, a remodel of Studio A  was completed, including the addition of a Neve 8088 recording console custom-built for and previously in use at The Who's Ramport Studios.

In 1986, Grossman's wife Sally assumed directorship of Bearsville following his death.

The Bearsville Theater, a barn converted in 1989, offered space for rehearsals and live performances.

Bearsville at Turtle Creek
In 2002, the building that housed the original Bearsville Studios A and B was sold, with Sally Grossman utilizing components from the former studios to repurpose the Turtle Creek Barn into a new studio named Bearsville at Turtle Creek. By 2004, Sally Grossman had sold all Bearsville complex properties, including the Turtle Creek Barn, the Bearsville Theater, two restaurants, and the Utopia soundstage.

Bearsville Center
In August 2019, the Bearsville Theatre complex was purchased by Lizzie Vann, who re-opened the complex as the Bearsville Center.

Notable artists
Artists who recorded at Bearsville include The Band, Todd Rundgren, The Isley Brothers, Utopia, Meat Loaf, Foghat, Patti Smith Group, The Pretenders, R.E.M., Joe Jackson, Suzanne Vega, Jeff Buckley, Blues Traveler, Natalie Merchant, Phish, The Connells, Dave Matthews Band, Branford Marsalis Quartet, The Derek Trucks Band, and Saliva.

From May 27 until June 8, 1978, The Rolling Stones rehearsed at Bearsville for their US Tour 1978, later released as the Complete Woodstock Tapes 4-disc set.

Beginning in 1988, R.E.M. recorded significant portions of three successive albums at Bearsville. The music historian Barney Hoskyns, in his 2016 book about Woodstock, Small Town Talk, wrote that the band's presence "was certainly a highwater mark in the studio's life."

In 1988, The Replacements had a 10-day recording session at Bearsville during which they trashed the recording studio and living quarters and played a game they called "dodge knife" that was like dodgeball but using knives. The recordings, originally intended for the band's album Don't Tell a Soul were not included on the album. They were eventually released in 2019 as part of the Dead Man's Pop box set.

In late 1993 and early 1994, Jeff Buckley recorded his debut album Grace at Bearsville.

Selected list of albums recorded at Bearsville Studios (by year)

 1970 - Todd Rundgren - Runt
 1971 - The Band - Cahoots
 1972 - Todd Rundgren - Something/Anything?
 1974 - Claude Dubois - Claude Dubois
 1977 - The Isley Brothers - Go for Your Guns
 1977 - Meat Loaf - Bat Out of Hell
 1977 - Utopia - Ra
 1978 - The Isley Brothers - Showdown (Isley Brothers album)
 1979 - Patti Smith Group - Wave
 1981 - Jim Steinman - Bad for Good
 1986 - The Pretenders - Get Close
 1987 - Marshall Crenshaw - Mary Jean & 9 Others
 1987 - Suzanne Vega - Solitude Standing
 1988 - Joe Jackson - Blaze of Glory
 1991 - R.E.M. - Out of Time
 1992 - R.E.M. - Automatic for the People
 1994 - Jeff Buckley - Grace
 1994 - Dave Matthews Band - Under the Table and Dreaming
 1994 - Blues Traveler - four
 1995 - Fear Factory - Demanufacture
 1995 - Faith No More - King for a Day... Fool for a Lifetime
 1995 - Natalie Merchant - Tigerlily
 1996 - Phish - Billy Breathes
 1996 - Dave Matthews Band - Crash
 1998 - Phish - The Story of the Ghost
 1999 - Skunk Anansie - Post Orgasmic Chill
 2000 - Branford Marsalis Quartet - Contemporary Jazz
 2000 - Harvey Danger - King James Version
 2001 - Hedwig and the Angry Inch Motion Picture Soundtrack 2004 - The Vines - Winning Days 2007 - Saliva - Blood Stained Love Story 2007 - matt pond PA - Last Light''

References

External links
Bearsville Studios website
Bearsville Studios at Bearsville Theater website
Bearsville Studios page at Spirit of Metal

1969 establishments in New York (state)
2004 disestablishments in New York (state)
American companies established in 1969
American companies disestablished in 2004
Mass media companies established in 1969
Mass media companies disestablished in 2004
Recording studios in New York (state)
Mass media in Ulster County, New York
Woodstock, New York